"Keep On Smilin'" is a pop song written by George Young and Harry Vanda and recorded by Australian pop singer John Paul Young. The song was released in August 1976 as the second single from Young's second studio album, J.P.Y. (1976). The song peaked at number 15 on the Kent Music Report in Australia.

Track listing 
7" (AP 11218) 
Side A – "Keep On Smilin'" - 2:54
Side B – "If I Could Live My Life Again" - 3:26

Charts

Weekly charts

Year-end charts

References 

1976 songs
1976 singles
John Paul Young songs
Songs written by Harry Vanda
Songs written by George Young (rock musician)
Song recordings produced by Harry Vanda
Song recordings produced by George Young (rock musician)
Albert Productions singles